Spasskoye is a rural locality (a selo) in Rozhdestvenskoye Rural Settlement, Sobinsky District, Vladimir Oblast, Russia. The population was 4 as of 2010.

Geography 
The village is located 17 km north-west from Rozhdestveno, 47 km north-west from Sobinka.

References 

Rural localities in Sobinsky District